The upland chorus frog (Pseudacris feriarum) is a species of chorus frog found in the United States. It was recently separated from the Western chorus frog, (Pseudacris triseriata), being identified as an individual species rather than a subspecies.

Habitat 
Within their range, this species is found in a variety of habitats that include: swampy areas of broad valleys, grassy swales, moist areas of woodlands and borders of heavily vegetated ponds.

Description
Upland chorus frogs are usually brown, grey-brown, or reddish-brown in color, with darker blotching. They grow from 0.75–1.5 inches (1.9–3.8 cm) in size.

Geographic distribution
Found in the southern and eastern United States, the upland chorus frog is found from the state of New Jersey to the Florida panhandle; west to eastern Texas and southeast Oklahoma.

Behavior

Upland chorus frogs are secretive, nocturnal frogs, and are rarely seen (or heard) except immediately after rains. They are an almost entirely terrestrial species, and found in a variety of habitats, but usually moderately moist, vegetated areas, not far from a permanent water source. Like most frogs, they are insectivorous. Breeding occurs throughout the year, but most frequently during the cooler, more rainy periods from November to March. Eggs are laid in clusters of 60 or so, in water and attached to vegetation. The female can lay upwards of 1,000 eggs at a time.

Conservation status
The upland chorus frog is listed as a protected species in the state of New Jersey, primarily due to habitat destruction. Because of its restrictive habitat preferences, this species is declining in several states, particularly in areas where roadside ditches and other ephemeral pools are being drained or destroyed for new developments.

References

 Database entry includes a range map and a brief justification of why this species is of least concern.
IUCN RangeMap: Pseudacris feriarum
Virginia Department of Game & Inland Fisheries: Upland Chorus Frog
Frogs and Toads of Georgia: Upland Chorus Frog

External links
Brazos Bend State Park:   Flora and Fauna  /  Amphibians  /  Upland Chorus Frog
North Carolina Nature: Upland Chorus Frog

Chorus frogs
Amphibians of the United States
Frogs of North America
Fauna of the Northeastern United States
Fauna of the Southeastern United States
Ecology of the Appalachian Mountains
Amphibians described in 1854
Taxa named by Spencer Fullerton Baird